Mandibles is a 2020 French-Belgian comedy film written and directed by Quentin Dupieux. It stars David Marsais, Grégoire Ludig, Adèle Exarchopoulos, India Hair, Roméo Elvis, Coralie Russier, Bruno Lochet, and Dave Chapman.

Mandibles had its world premiere at the 77th Venice International Film Festival on September 5, 2020. It was released in France on May 19, 2021 by Memento Films. Its release was delayed several times from an original December 2020 date due to the COVID-19 pandemic.

Plot
Jean-Gab and Manu, two simple-minded friends, find a giant fly stuck in the trunk of a car and set themselves up to train it to earn money with it.

Cast

 David Marsais as Jean-Gab
 Grégoire Ludig as Manu
 Adèle Exarchopoulos as Agnès
 India Hair as Cécile
 Roméo Elvis as Serge
 Coralie Russier as Sandrine
 Bruno Lochet as Gilles
 Marius Colucci as an officer
 Thomas Blanchard as an officer
 Raphaël Quenard as Raimondo
 Gaspard Augé as a security guard
 Philippe Dusseau as Michel Michel
 Olivier Blanc as the butler
 Jean-Paul Solal as Maître Wolf
 Dave Chapman as The Fly

Production
In October 2019, it was announced David Marsais, Grégoire Ludig, Adèle Exarchopoulos, India Hair, Roméo Elvis and Coralie Russier had joined the cast of the film, with Quentin Dupieux directing from a screenplay he wrote. Principal photography began in September 2019.

Music
The soundtrack was composed by the English band Metronomy. The main theme of the film was released by Because Music, the same day as the film was released in French theaters.

Release
The film had its world premiere at the 77th Venice International Film Festival on September 5, 2020. It was also selected to screen at the Telluride Film Festival in September 2020, prior to its cancellation. It was released in France on May 19, 2021.

Reception

Critical reception
The website's critics consensus reads, "Mandibles finds writer-director Quentin Dupieux off on another thoroughly original flight of fancy that will captivate like-minded audiences while baffling others."

Future
During an interview in the French magazine CinemaTeaser, Dupieux hinted that he was ready to make a sequel if the film exceeded 500,000 admissions in France. The sequel would be called Tentacles.

References

External links
 

2020 comedy films
2020 films
2020s fantasy comedy films
2020s French films
French comedy films
French fantasy comedy films
Belgian comedy films
Films directed by Quentin Dupieux
Films postponed due to the COVID-19 pandemic